Michael Alfio Pennisi (born March 13, 1975) is an Australian-Filipino former professional basketball player. He last played for the GlobalPort Batang Pier of the Philippine Basketball Association (PBA). He was automatically hired by Red Bull in 2000. He was then traded to San Miguel for future draft picks.

Player profile

An Australian-Filipino, Pennisi is a very good left-handed 3-point shooter. He played five seasons with the Townsville Crocodiles before moving to the Philippines. In the 2007–08 PBA Philippine Cup, he was the third highest 3-point field goal shooter behind his former teammate Mike Hrabak and Ren-Ren Ritualo. His career high is 29 points. He is also a many-time member of the Philippine national basketball team.

Professional career

Townsville Crocodiles (1995–1999)
Pennisi started his career with the Townsville Suns of the Australian NBL.

Red Bull Barako (2000–2008)
In 2000, he decided to try his luck in the Philippines where he was signed by Red Bull Barako, then an expansion team in the Philippine Basketball Association. There, he was one of the team's stars, along with Lordy Tugade, Junthy Valenzuela, Davonn Harp, and Kerby Raymundo, leading Red Bull to two consecutive Commissioner's Cup championships in 2001 and 2002 PBA Commissioner's Cup. He was also a key player in Red Bull's 2006 PBA Fiesta Conference championship-winning squad.

San Miguel Beermen / Petron Blaze Boosters (2008–2011)
Pennisi was traded to the San Miguel Beermen after the 2008 PBA Fiesta Conference in exchange for San Miguel's 2010 first round pick (which Red Bull traded to Barangay Ginebra which then used it to pick John Wilson).

Barako Bull Energy Cola / Barako Bull Energy (2011–2014)
On August 28, 2011, Pennisi was traded by San Miguel to Barako Bull Energy Cola along with Sunday Salvacion and the rights for the 2010 no. 8 pick (which was used by Barako Bull to pick Allein Maliksi for Dondon Hontiveros.

On March 21, 2012, he achieved his 700th career 3-point field goal in the 1st quarter of their game against his former team, Petron Blaze Boosters. He became only the eighth player to achieve such feat joining a list that included Allan Caidic and Ronnie Magsanoc. On the same day also he made a controversy by reacting late in a flop when Will McDonald threw the ball thus, hitting Mick Pennisi in the head.

Purefoods Star Hotshots / Star Hotshots (2014–2015)
On December 8, 2014, Pennisi was traded to Purefoods Star Hotshots in exchange for Ronnie Matias and Isaac Holstein.

Return to Barako Bull / Phoenix (2015–2016)
On September 19, 2015, Pennisi was sent by the Hotshots back to Barako Bull in exchange for Barako Bull's 2017 second round pick.

GlobalPort Batang Pier (2016–2017)
On November 11, 2016, Pennisi was traded by the Phoenix Fuel Masters to the GlobalPort Batang Pier in exchange for Doug Kramer.

On September 2, 2017, he announced his retirement after playing 17 seasons in the PBA.

PBA career statistics

Season-by-season averages

|-
| align=left | 
| align=left | Red Bull
| 35 || 39.2 || .425 || .351 || .710 || 7.4 || 2.3 || .6 || 1.7 || 10.5
|-
| align=left | 
| align=left | Red Bull
| 41 || 26.1 || .411 || .322 || .679 || 6.1 || 1.2 || .2 || 1.3 || 7.6
|-
| align=left | 
| align=left | Red Bull
| 12 || 23.3 || .432 || .345 || .735 || 6.5 || 1.2 || .0 || .5 || 8.3
|-
| align=left | 
| align=left | Red Bull
| 43 || 25.4 || .454 || .398 || .713 || 6.4 || 1.4 || .3 || .7 || 10.1
|-
| align=left | 
| align=left | Red Bull
| 32 || 29.6 || .404 || .350 || .736 || 7.3 || 2.0 || .2 || .8 || 11.1
|-
| align=left | 
| align=left | Red Bull
| 65 || 24.6 || .415 || .342 || .721 || 6.3 || 1.4 || .3 || .8 || 8.7
|-
| align=left | 
| align=left | Red Bull
| 30 || 27.8 || .367 || .349 || .696 || 7.6 || 1.3 || .4 || 1.3 || 10.8
|-
| align=left | 
| align=left | Red Bull
| 50 || 27.4 || .385 || .376 || .720 || 6.4 || 1.2 || .3 || .6 || 8.6
|-
| align=left | 
| align=left | San Miguel
| 57 || 25.0 || .390 || .350 || .802 || 5.1 || 1.2 || .3 || .7 || 6.8
|-
| align=left | 
| align=left | San Miguel
| 46 || 18.6 || .419 || .400 || .962 || 4.1 || .8 || .2 || .6 || 4.5
|-
| align=left | 
| align=left | San Miguel
| 46 || 14.8 || .385 || .275 || .882 || 3.5 || .9 || .1 || .1 || 3.9
|-
| align=left | 
| align=left | Barako Bull
| 39 || 23.3 || .409 || .341 || .754 || 4.5 || 1.3 || .4 || .6 || 7.7
|-
| align=left | 
| align=left | Barako Bull
| 37 || 23.5 || .406 || .337 || .736 || 4.5 || 1.1 || .3 || .7 || 8.1
|-
| align=left | 
| align=left | Barako Bull
| 34 || 23.7 || .458 || .415 || .767 || 5.4 || 1.1 || .3 || .3 || 9.0
|-
| align=left | 
| align=left | Barako Bull / Star
| 41 || 14.5 || .338 || .289 || .654 || 2.7 || .7 || .1 || .3 || 3.7
|-
| align=left | 
| align=left | Barako Bull / Phoenix
| 35 || 17.1 || .395 || .402 || .824 || 3.2 || .7 || .1 || .4 || 5.1
|-
| align=left | 
| align=left | GlobalPort
| 19 || 13.0 || .440 || .400 || .625 || 2.4 || .5 || .1 || .2 || 3.5
|-class=sortbottom
| align=center colspan=2 | Career
| 662 || 23.3 || .407 || .355 || .748 || 5.3 || 1.2 || .3 || .7 || 7.5

References

1975 births
Living people
Australian people of Filipino descent
Barako Bull Energy Boosters players
Barako Bull Energy players
Basketball players at the 2002 Asian Games
Centers (basketball)
Eastern Michigan Eagles men's basketball players
Citizens of the Philippines through descent
NorthPort Batang Pier players
Magnolia Hotshots players
Philippine Basketball Association All-Stars
Philippines men's national basketball team players
Filipino men's basketball players
Phoenix Super LPG Fuel Masters players
San Miguel Beermen players
Asian Games competitors for the Philippines